Letnica is a village in the municipality of Vitia, Kosovo.

Geography 
The village is located in the Karadak Mountain range.

Notes and references 
Notes:

References:

References 

Villages in Viti, Kosovo